Golconda Abbulu is a 1982 Telugu drama film directed by Dasari Narayana Rao and produced by Kumarjee. The film stars Krishnam Raju and Jaya Prada in the lead roles. The music was composed by K. V. Mahadevan.

Cast
Krishnam Raju as Ramu aka Golconda Abbulu
Jaya Prada
Kaikala Satyanarayana as Satyam
Rao Gopala Rao as Mayor JB
Allu Rama Lingaiah as Chandramouli
Kantha Rao
Mukkamala
Nirmalamma
Prabhakar Reddy
Chalapathi Rao
Mikkilineni
Manjula

External links

1982 films
1980s Telugu-language films
Indian drama films
Films directed by Dasari Narayana Rao
Films scored by K. V. Mahadevan